The Battle of New Orleans was fought on January 8, 1815 between the British Army under Major General Sir Edward Pakenham and the United States Army under Brevet Major General Andrew Jackson, roughly 5 miles (8 km) southeast of the French Quarter of New Orleans, in the current suburb of Chalmette, Louisiana. 

The battle was the climax of the five-month Gulf Campaign (September 1814 to February 1815) by Britain to try to take New Orleans, West Florida, and possibly Louisiana Territory which began at the First Battle of Fort Bowyer. Britain started the New Orleans campaign on December 14, 1814, at the Battle of Lake Borgne and numerous skirmishes and artillery duels happened in the weeks leading up to the final battle.

The battle took place 15 days after the signing of the Treaty of Ghent, which formally ended the War of 1812, on December 24, 1814, though it would not be ratified by the United States (and therefore did not take effect) until February 16, 1815, as news of the agreement had not yet reached the United States from Europe. Despite a large British advantage in numbers, training, and experience, the American forces defeated a poorly executed assault in slightly more than 30 minutes. The Americans suffered just 71 casualties, while the British suffered over 2,000, including the deaths of the commanding general, Major General Sir Edward Pakenham, and his second-in-command, Major General Samuel Gibbs.

Background
In August 1814, Britain and the United States began negotiations to end the War of 1812. However, British Secretary of State for War and the Colonies Henry Bathurst issued Pakenham's secret orders on October 24, 1814, commanding him to continue the war even if he heard rumors of peace. Bathurst expressed concern that the United States might not ratify a treaty and did not want Pakenham either to endanger his forces or miss an opportunity for victory. Prior to that, in August 1814, Vice Admiral Cochrane had convinced the Admiralty that a campaign against New Orleans would weaken American resolve against Canada and hasten a successful end to the war.

There was a major concern that the British and their Spanish allies wanted to reclaim the territories of the Louisiana Purchase because they did not recognize any land deals made by Napoleon (first the 1800 transfer of Louisiana from Spain to France and then the 1803–1804 transfer of Louisiana from France to the United States) so that was the reason why the British invaded New Orleans in the middle of the Treaty of Ghent negotiations. If the British had won the Battle of New Orleans, they would have likely interpreted that all territories gained from the 1803 Louisiana Purchase would be void and not part of U.S. territory. It has been claimed that British military communications indicate that Great Britain intended to take and keep New Orleans, which would have halted the westward expansion of the United States. This is contradicted by the content of Bathurst's correspondence, and disputed by Latimer, with specific reference to correspondence from the Prime Minister to the Foreign Secretary dated December 23, 1814.

Opposing forces

Prelude

Lake Borgne

Sixty British ships had anchored in the Gulf of Mexico to the east of Lake Pontchartrain and Lake Borgne by December 14, 1814, under the command of Admiral Sir Alexander Cochrane. An American flotilla of five gunboats, commanded by Lieutenant Thomas ap Catesby Jones, blocked British access to the lakes. On December 14, around 980 British sailors and Royal Marines under Captain Nicholas Lockyer, set out to attack Jones's force. Lockyer's men sailed in 42 rowboats, almost all armed with a small carronade. Lockyer captured Jones's vessels in a brief engagement. Casualties included 17 British sailors killed and 77 wounded, while 6 Americans were killed, 35 wounded, and the remaining crews captured. The wounded included both Jones and Lockyer.

One unintended consequence is that it is believed the gunboat crews in captivity were able to mislead the British as to Jackson's strength in numbers, when they were questioned. There is a popular story concerning Purser Thomas Shields and Surgeon Robert Morrell, who were sent under a flag of truce to negotiate the return of the prisoners on parole. They were placed in a cabin, where their conversation could be heard. Shields, having hearing difficulties, talked loudly and mentioned that 20,000 troops were under Jackson's command. There was nothing in the actions of the British commanders to indicate they believed they were faced with superior numbers.

Disembarkation by the British
It took six days and nights to ferry the troops, each transit taking around ten hours.

There were three potential routes to the east of the Mississippi that the British could take, in addition to traversing up the Mississippi itself.  Rather than a slow approach to New Orleans up the Mississippi River, the British chose to advance on an overland route. The first route was to take the Rigolets passage into Lake Pontchartrain, and thence to disembark two miles north of the city. One hindrance was the fort at Petit Coquilles at the Rigolets passage.

The second option was to row to the Plain of Gentilly via the Bayou Chef Menteur, and to take the Chef Menteur Road that went from the Rigolets to the city. It was narrow, and could be easily blocked. Jackson was aware of this, and had it well guarded.

The third option was to head to Bayou Bienvenue, then Bayou Mazant and via the Villeré Canal to disembark at a point one mile from the Mississippi and seven miles south of the city. This latter option was taken by Keane.

Andrew Lambert notes that Keane squandered a passing opportunity to succeed, when he decided to not take the open road to New Orleans. Reilly observes that there has been a general acceptance that Cochrane cajoled Keane into a premature and ill-advised attack, but there is no evidence to support this theory. Codrington's correspondence does imply that the first option was intended to be followed by Cochrane, based upon inaccurate map details, as documented by Cochrane's papers. The shallow waters of the narrow passes of the Rigolets and the Chef Menteur could not take any vessel drawing eight feet or more.

A further hindrance was the lack of shallow draft vessels, which Cochrane had requested, yet the Admiralty had refused. As a consequence, even when using all shallow boats, it was not possible to transport more than 2,000 men at a time.

Villeré Plantation

They could have attacked the city by advancing a few hours up the undefended river road, but Keane decided to encamp at Lacoste's Plantation and wait for the arrival of reinforcements. The British invaded the home of Major Gabriel Villeré, but he escaped through a window and hastened to warn General Jackson of the approaching army and the position of their encampment. According to historian Stanley Clisby Arthur: 'At the close of Major Villeré's narrative the General drew up his figure, bowed with disease and weakness, to its full height, and with an eye of fire and an emphatic blow upon the table with his clenched fist, exclaimed: "By the Eternal, they shall not sleep on our soil!"

Commencement of battle

Jackson's raid on the British camp
Following Villeré's intelligence report, on the evening of December 23, Jackson led 2,131 men in a brief three-pronged assault from the north on the unsuspecting British troops, who were resting in their camp. The Americans suffered 24 killed, 115 wounded, and 74 missing, while the British reported their losses as 46 killed, 167 wounded, and 64 missing. Consequentially, as at December 25 Pakenham's forces now had an effective strength of 5,933 out of a headcount of 6,660 soldiers. Historian Robert Quimby states that the British won a "tactical victory, which enabled them to maintain their position", but they "were disabused of their expectation of an easy conquest". As a consequence, the Americans gained time to transform the canal into a heavily fortified earthwork.

British reconnaissance-in-force
On Christmas Day, General Edward Pakenham arrived on the battlefield. Two days later he received nine large naval artillery guns from Admiral Cochrane along with a hot shot furnace to silence the two U.S. Navy warships, the sloop-of-war  and the schooner , that were harassing the army for 24 hours per day the past week from the Mississippi River. The Carolina was sunk in a massive explosion by the British, but the Louisiana survived thanks to the Baratarian pirates aboard getting into rowboats and tying the ship to the rowboats and rowing it further north away from the British artillery. The Louisiana was not able to sail northward under her own power due to the attack. These two vessels were now no longer a danger to the British, but Jackson ordered the ships' surviving guns and crew to be stationed on the west bank and provide covering fire for any British assault on the river road to Line Jackson (name of the U.S. defensive line at the Rodriguez Canal) and New Orleans. After silencing the two ships, Pakenham ordered a reconnaissance-in-force on December 28 against the earthworks. The reconnaissance-in-force was designed to test Line Jackson and see how well-defended it was, and if any section of the line was weak the British would take advantage of the situation, break through, and call for thousands of more soldiers to smash through the defenses. On the right side of this offensive the British soldiers successfully sent the militia defenders into a retreating panic with their huge show of force and were just a few hundred yards from breaching the defensive line, but the left side of the reconnaissance-in-force turned into tragedy for the British. The surviving artillery guns from the two neutralized warships successfully defended the section of Line Jackson closest to the Mississippi River with enfilading fire, making it look like the British offensive completely failed even though on the section closest to the swamp the British were on the verge of breaking through. Pakenham inexplicably decided to withdraw all the soldiers after seeing the left side of his reconnaissance-in-force collapsing and retreating in panic. The British suffered 16 killed and 43 wounded and the Americans suffered 7 killed and 10 wounded. Luck saved Line Jackson on this day and this was the closest the British came during the whole campaign to defeating Jackson.

After the failure of this operation Pakenham met with General Keane and Admiral Cochrane that evening for an update on the situation. Pakenham wanted to use Chef Menteur Pass as the invasion route, but he was overruled by Admiral Cochrane, who insisted that his boats were providing everything needed. Admiral Cochrane believed that the veteran British soldiers would easily destroy Jackson's ramshackle army, and he allegedly said that if the army did not do it, his sailors would, and the meeting settled the method and place of the attack.

When the British reconnaissance force withdrew, the Americans immediately began constructing earthworks to protect the artillery batteries, further strengthening Line Jackson. They installed eight batteries, which included one 32-pound gun, three 24-pounders, one 18-pounder, three 12-pounders, three 6-pounders, and a  howitzer. Jackson also sent a detachment to the west bank of the Mississippi to man two 24-pounders and two 12-pounders on the grounded warship . Even so, the British greatly outnumbered the Americans. Jackson's total of 4,732 men was made up of 968 Army regulars, 58 Marines (holding the center of the defensive line), 106 Navy seamen, 1,060 Louisiana militia and volunteers (including 462 Black people), 1,352 Tennessee militia, 986 Kentucky militia, 150 Mississippi militia, and 52 Choctaw warriors, along with a force from pirate Jean Lafitte's Baratarians.  Jackson in the first week of the New Orleans land campaign that began on December 23 also had the support of the warships in the Mississippi River, including USS Louisiana, USS Carolina, the schooner USS Eagle, and the steamboat .  The naval warships were neutralized by the heavy naval artillery guns brought in by Pakenham and Cochrane a few days after Christmas. Major Thomas Hinds' Squadron of Light Dragoons, a militia unit from the Mississippi Territory, arrived at the battle on December 22.

Artillery duel

The main British army arrived on New Year's Day 1815 and began an artillery bombardment of the American earthworks. Jackson's headquarters, Macarty House, was fired at for the first 10 minutes of the skirmish while Jackson and his officers were eating breakfast. The house was completely destroyed but Jackson and the officers escaped harm. The Americans recovered quickly and mobilized their own artillery to fire back at the British artillery. This began an exchange of artillery fire that continued for three hours. Several of the American guns were silenced, including the 32-pounder, a 24-pounder, and a 12-pounder, while some damage was done to the earthworks. The British suffered even greater, losing 13 guns (5 British batteries out of 7 total batteries were silenced by the Americans). The remaining British artillery finally exhausted its ammunition, and Pakenham canceled the attack. Major General Gibbs during the artillery duel sent soldiers to try to outflank Line Jackson on the right due to the near-success of the December 28 skirmish. A combined force of Tennessee militia and Choctaw warriors used heavy small arms fire to repel this maneuver. The Tennessee and Choctaw soldiers even moved forward in front of Line Jackson and counterattacked, guerrilla-style, to guarantee the British withdrawal. After yet another failure to breach Line Jackson Pakenham decided to wait for his entire force of 8,000 men to assemble before continuing his attack. (The 40th Foot arrived too late, disembarking on 12 January 1815.) The British lost 45 killed and 55 wounded in the artillery duel and the Americans lost 11 killed and 23 wounded. British morale completely collapsed after expecting an easy, bloodless victory against an opposing army heavily composed of, in their minds, non-professional militia, pirates, and squirrel hunters during the past 3 battles in the previous 10 days. Hundreds of shell-shocked British soldiers refused to follow orders and retrieve damaged but repairable guns that were abandoned in the battlefield during the afternoon. Pakenham had to personally lead the soldiers to retrieve the guns later that night.

Battle

The Americans had constructed three lines of defense, with the forward line four miles south of the city. It was strongly entrenched at the Rodriguez Canal, which stretched from a swamp to the river, with a timber, loop-holed breastwork and earthworks for artillery. General Lambert and two infantry battalions totaling 1700 soldiers disembarked and reinforced the British on January 5.

Right Bank
The British battle plan was for an attack against the 20-gun west bank battery, then to turn those guns on the American line to assist the frontal attack. In the early morning of January 8, Pakenham gave his final orders for the two-pronged assault. Colonel William Thornton was to cross the Mississippi during the night with his force, move rapidly upriver, storm the battery commanded by Commodore Daniel Patterson on the flank of the main American entrenchments, and then open an enfilading fire on Jackson's line with the captured artillery, directly across from the earthworks manned by the vast majority of American troops. Keane was to lead a column along the river, and Major General Samuel Gibbs was to lead a column along the swamp. The brigade commanded by Major General John Lambert was held in reserve.

The British dug a canal to enable 42 small boats to get to the river. Preparations for the attack had foundered early on January 8, as the canal collapsed and the dam failed, leaving the sailors to drag the boats through the mud with Thornton's west bank assault force. This left the force starting off just before daybreak, 8 hours late according to Thornton's dispatch, assessed in 2008 to be 12 hours late. The frontal attack was not postponed, however, as the British hoped that the force on the west bank would create a diversion, even if they did not succeed in the assault.

The only British success of the battle was the delayed attack on the west bank of the Mississippi River, where Thornton's brigade of the 85th Regiment of Foot and detachments from the Royal Navy and Royal Marines 
attacked and overwhelmed the American line. The 700 militiamen were routed. The British had the advantage of the element of surprise. The decision by General Morgan to deploy his troops in two positions a mile apart, neither defensible, was favorable for the British. Morgan's mismanagement of his Kentucky and Louisiana militiamen was an open invitation to defeat. Whilst the retreat of the militia has been criticized, such a move was no less than prudent. An inquiry found that the conduct was 'not reprehensible'. Captain Rowland Money led the Navy detachment, and Brevet Major Thomas Adair led the Marines. Money was captain of HMS Trave, and Adair was the commanding officer of 's detachment of Marines. As a consequence of the sides of the canal caved in and choked the passage that night, only enough boats got through to carry 600 men, being a third of the intended force. Thornton did not make allowance for the current, and it carried him about two miles below the intended landing place.

His brigade won their battle, but Thornton was badly wounded. Army casualties among the 85th Foot were two dead, one captured, and 41 wounded, the battalion reduced to 270 effectives on the Right Bank. Royal Navy casualties were two dead, Captain Rowland Money and 18 seamen wounded. Royal Marine casualties were two dead, with three officers, one sergeant, and 12 other ranks wounded. By contrast, the defenders' casualties were two dead, eleven wounded and nineteen missing. Both Jackson and Commodore Patterson reported that the retreating forces had spiked their cannon, leaving no guns to turn on the Americans' main defense line; Major Michell's diary, however, claims that he had "commenced cleaning enemy's guns to form a battery to enfilade their lines on the left bank".  

General Lambert ordered his Chief of Artillery Colonel Alexander Dickson to assess the position. Dickson reported back that no fewer than 2,000 men would be required to hold the position. Lambert issued orders to withdraw after the defeat of their main army on the east bank and retreated, taking a few American prisoners and cannon with them. The Americans were so dismayed by the loss of this battery, which would be capable of inflicting much damage on their lines when the attack was renewed, that they were preparing to abandon the town when they received the news that the British were withdrawing, according to one British regimental historian. Reilly does not agree, but does note that Jackson was eager to send Humbert and 400 men to retake the position from Thornton's troops. Carson Ritchie goes as far to assert that 'it was not Pakenham, but Sir Alexander Dickson who lost the third battle of New Orleans' in consequence of his recommendation to evacuate the Right Bank. , and that 'he could think of nothing but defense'.

This success, being described as 'a brilliant exploit by the British, and a disgraceful exhibition [of General Morgan's leadership] by the Americans,' had no effect on the final outcome of the battle.

Left Bank

The main attack began in darkness and a heavy fog, but the fog lifted as the British neared the main American line, exposing them to withering artillery fire. Lieutenant Colonel Thomas Mullins, the British commander of the 44th Regiment of Foot, had forgotten the ladders and fascines needed to cross the eight-foot-deep and fifteen-foot-wide canal and scale the earthworks, and the British forces fell into confusion. Most of the senior officers were killed or wounded, including Major General Samuel Gibbs, who was killed leading the main attack column on the right, and Colonel Rennie, who led a detachment on the left by the river.

The Highlanders of the 93rd Regiment of Foot were ordered to leave Keane's assault column advancing along the river, possibly because of Thornton's delay in crossing the river and the artillery fire that might hit them, and to move across the open field to join the main force on the right. Keane fell wounded as he crossed the field with the 93rd. Rennie's men managed to attack and overrun an American advance redoubt next to the river, but they could neither hold the position nor successfully storm the main American line behind it without reinforcements. Within a few minutes, the American 7th Infantry arrived, moved forward, and fired upon the British in the captured redoubt; within half an hour, Rennie and nearly all of his men were dead. In the main attack on the right, the British infantrymen flung themselves to the ground, huddled in the canal, or were mowed down by a combination of musket fire and grapeshot from the Americans. A handful made it to the top of the parapet on the right, but they were killed or captured. The riflemen of the 95th Regiment of Foot had advanced in open skirmish order ahead of the main assault force and were concealed in the ditch below the parapet, unable to advance further without support.

The two large main assaults were repulsed. Pakenham and Gibbs were fatally wounded while on horseback by grapeshot fired from the earthworks. Major Wilkinson of the 21st Regiment of Foot reformed his lines and made a third assault. They were able to reach the entrenchments and attempted to scale them. Wilkinson made it to the top before being shot. The Americans were amazed at his bravery and carried him behind the rampart. The British soldiers stood out in the open and were shot apart with grapeshot from Line Jackson, including the 93rd Highlanders, having no orders to advance further or retreat. General Lambert was in the reserve and took command. He gave the order for his reserve to advance and ordered the withdrawal of the army. The reserve was used to cover the retreat of what was left of the British army in the field.

The inability of Thornton's troops to have taken the Right Bank at night, in advance of the main assault, meant that the British were enfiladed by the American batteries. It has been observed that Keane's failure, to have taken the Chef Menteur Road, was compounded when the aggressively natured Pakenham went ahead and launched a frontal assault before the vital flank operation on the other bank of the river had been completed, at a cost of over 2,000 casualties.

Analysis
The Battle of New Orleans was remarkable both for its apparent brevity and its casualties, though some numbers are in dispute and contradict the official statistics. The defenders of the Left Bank had casualties amounting to 11 killed and 23 wounded; American losses were only 13 killed, 39 wounded, and 19 missing or captured in total on that day. Robert Remini and Anthony S Pitch make reference to the British casualty reports of 291 killed, 1,262 wounded, and 484 missing, a total loss of 2,037 men. Among the prisoners taken when the British retreated from the battlefield, Jackson estimated three hundred were mortally wounded. Colonel Arthur P. Hayne's dispatch to Jackson dated January 13 estimated the British had 700 fatalities and 1400 wounded, with 501 prisoners of war in his custody. A reduction in headcount due to 443 British soldiers' deaths since the prior month was reported on January 25, which is lower than Hayne's estimate of 700 for the battle alone.

The large number of casualties suffered by the British on the Left Bank reflects their failure to maintain the element of surprise, with plenty of advance notice being given to the defenders, owing to the delays in executing the attack on the Right Bank. The failure of the British to have breached the parapet and conclusively eliminated the first line of defense was to result in high casualties as successive waves of men marching in column whilst the prepared defenders were able to direct their fire into a Kill zone, hemmed in by the riverbank and the swamp.  

Reilly supports the assertion that it was the American artillery that won the battle. The losses among the regiments out of range of small arms fire were disproportionately high, with almost every British account emphasizing the effect of heavy gunfire. In contrast, the riflemen of the 95th Foot in skirmish order, the most difficult target for artillery, had lost only 11 killed. Dickson's eyewitness account is clear that the British were only within musket shot range for less than five minutes. The account by Latour states the battalions of Plauché, Daquin, Lacoste, along with three quarters of the 44th US Infantry did not fire at all. In order to have inflicted such a heavy toll on the British, it would not have been possible to have done this primarily with musket fire, of which the best trained men could only manage two shots per minute. Unlike their British counterparts, the American forces had larger guns, and more of them. They were situated in well-protected earthworks, with a ditch and stockade. The Americans therefore had a number of advantages, but they should not minimize the skill and bravery of their gunners.  

Almost universal blame was assigned to Colonel Mullins of the 44th Foot which had been detailed to carry fascines and ladders to the front to enable the British soldiers to cross the ditch and scale the parapet and fight their way to the American breastwork. Mullins was found half a mile to the rear when he was needed at the front. Pakenham learned of Mullins' conduct and placed himself at the head of the 44th, endeavoring to lead them to the front with the implements needed to storm the works, when he fell wounded after being hit with grapeshot some 500 yards from the front line. He was hit again while being helped to mount a horse, this time mortally wounded.

Aftermath

Fort St. Philip

Fort St. Philip, manned by an American garrison, defended the river approach to New Orleans. British naval forces attacked the fort on January 9 but were unsuccessful, withdrawing after ten days of bombardment with exploding bomb shells from two bomb vessels. In a dispatch sent to the Secretary of War, dated January 19, Jackson stated: "I am strengthened not only by [the defeat of the British at New Orleans] ... but by the failure of his fleet to pass fort St. Philip."

British withdrawal
Despite news of capture of the American battery on the west bank of the Mississippi River, British officers concluded that continuing the Louisiana campaign would be too costly. Three days after the battle, General Lambert held a council of war. Deciding to withdraw, the British left camp at Villeré's Plantation by January 19. They were not pursued in any strength. The Chalmette battlefield was the plantation home of Colonel Denis de La Ronde's half-brother Ignace Martin de Lino (1755–1815). The British forces burned it, reputedly causing de Lino's death from a broken heart shortly after returning home three weeks after the battle. The British returned to where they had landed, a distance in excess of sixty miles, the final troops re-embarked on January 27.

The British fleet embarked the troops and sailed toward Mobile Bay on February 4, 1815.   The army captured Fort Bowyer at the entrance to Mobile Bay on February 12. Preparations to attack Mobile were in progress when news arrived of the Treaty of Ghent. General Jackson also had made tentative plans to attack the British at Mobile and to continue the war into Spanish Florida. With Britain having ratified the treaty and the United States having resolved that hostilities should cease pending imminent ratification, the British left, sailing to the West Indies. The Battle of New Orleans occurred after the Treaty of Ghent was agreed to by British and American diplomats and therefore could not have influenced the negotiations, however United States resounding victory did motivate Great Britain to abide by the treaty, which required both sides return all territorial gains made at the other's expense during the war. Accordingly, even though the United States fully occupied West Florida in 1813, the Treaty of Ghent did not force them to leave after the war since prior to the Battle of New Orleans, Louisiana and West Florida were, according to the pre-Napoleonic era, Spanish territory in the eyes of Britain and Spain. If the British had won the battle and captured New Orleans it is unknown whether or not they would've returned the city to the United States even after the Senate unanimously ratified the Treaty of Ghent on February 16, 1815. The prevailing view is had the British taken New Orleans they likely would have remained as neither they nor the Spanish then recognized the validity of the Louisiana Purchase, as it had been brokered by Napoleon. Following the French Emperor's final defeat in 1815, the United States were left as the only country in the world which formally recognized the Louisiana Purchase. The Battle of New Orleans forced Britain and Spain to accept that the Louisiana territory belonged to the United States. Napoleon's escape from Elba on February 26 and return to power in France immediately involved Great Britain in a renewed war in Europe.

Assessment 

For the campaign, American casualties totaled 333 with 55 killed, 185 wounded, and 93 missing, while British casualties totaled 2,459 with 386 killed, 1,521 wounded, and 552 missing, according to the respective official casualty returns. A reduction in headcount due to 443 British soldiers' deaths since the prior month was reported on January 25. The effective strength of the British had reduced from 5,933 to 4,868 soldiers of the original force, bolstered by 681 and 785 soldiers of the 7th Foot and 43rd Foot respectively. More than 600 prisoners of war were released from Jackson's captivity by March 1815.

The battle became historically important mainly for the meaning Americans gave it, particularly with respect to Jackson. News of victory "came upon the country like a clap of thunder in the clear azure vault of the firmament, and traveled with electromagnetic velocity, throughout the confines of the land." The battle made Jackson's political reputation. Popular pamphlets, songs, editorials, speeches, and plays glorified Jackson's new, heroic image. The Democratic-Republican Party used the victory to ridicule the Federalist Party as cowards, defeatists, and secessionists. In fact, the Federalist Party ceased to exist after the Battle of New Orleans. Before New Orleans the war was overall a bloody stalemate with not a single overwhelming land battle victory for the Americans against an elite British Army unit (Lake Erie, Plattsburgh, and Baltimore were won primarily due to naval ships and forts near lakes or the ocean). Almost everybody in New England was against the war and supported seceding from the United States to either become independent or join the United Kingdom. The New England states met at the Hartford Convention and decided to deliver a set of demands to the federal government in January 1815, and if they did not abide by them, they would secede from the union. When the Hartford delegates were in Washington and on the way to see members of Congress and President Madison word of the Battle of New Orleans came and the Federalists and New Englanders were seen as traitors and anti-American and the convention was abolished. The Era of Good Feelings also resulted from the Battle of New Orleans. From 1815 to 1825 there was single-party rule in Washington and an overwhelming feeling of patriotism due to the extinction of the Federalist Party. The victory at New Orleans effectively kept the United States unified for the next 45 years until the American Civil War. The Eighth of January was a federal holiday from 1828 to 1861, and it was among the earliest national celebrations, as "previously, Americans had only celebrated events such as the Fourth of July or George Washington's birthday on a national scale". The anniversary of the battle was celebrated as an American holiday for many years called "The Eighth".

Orleans Square in Savannah, Georgia, is named in commemoration of the battle.

Near the end of Jackson's presidency, a congressman asked Jackson whether there was a point to the Battle of New Orleans. Jackson replied, "If General Pakenham and his 10,000 matchless veterans could have annihilated my little army, he would have captured New Orleans and sentried all the contiguous territory, though technically the war was over. Great Britain would have immediately abrogated the Treaty of Ghent and would have ignored Jefferson's transaction with Napoleon."

Poor British planning and communication, plus costly frontal assaults against an entrenched enemy, caused lopsided British casualties.

According to historian Thomas Perkins Abernethy, the British had an ambitious colonization plan for the "Crown colony of Louisiana" if they had succeeded in capturing New Orleans and Mobile. British officers on the New Orleans expeditionary force confirmed after the war that a "complete British civil government staff" was on board the invading ships and they were to be installed after Pakenham's forces captured New Orleans. These colonial government officials included an attorney general, an admiralty judge, a secretary for the colony sent directly from Britain, a superintendent for Indian affairs who was to be transferred to New Orleans from Canada, and numerous other officials. Pakenham reportedly carried with him a dispatch case that contained a commission declaring him Governor of Louisiana, the promise of an earldom, and a proclamation from the Colonial Office declaring the sovereignty of Britain in behalf of Spain "over all the territory fraudulently conveyed by Bonaparte to the United States".

At the same time that Mobile (this was the first British invasion route to New Orleans that failed) was under attack at the First Battle of Fort Bowyer in September 1814 the British successfully invaded and occupied the less-populated eastern part modern-day Maine, to the Penobscot River, at the Battle of Hampden. They re-established the Crown colony of New Ireland and intended to annex this colony permanently. If the British had quickly captured Mobile and New Orleans as well as occupying New Ireland before the end of the Treaty of Ghent negotiations, they possibly would have demanded a lot more than what actually happened as a result of them failing to capture Mobile and New Orleans.

The hundreds of dead British soldiers were likely buried at Jacques Villeré's plantation, which was the headquarters of the British Army during the New Orleans campaign. Nobody knows exactly where their final resting spot is. The only deceased British soldiers transported back to the United Kingdom were Generals Pakenham and Gibbs and Colonel Robert Rennie.

The Duke of Wellington faulted Cochrane and held that the attack could have succeeded  In a eulogy to his brother-in-law, General Edward Pakenham who died at New Orleans, he commented:

Legacy

Miracle at New Orleans

As the American forces were outnumbered by their British opponents, a wave of panic gripped the residents of New Orleans. Fearing that the city would fall to Pakenham's troops, a group of New Orleans residents, led by Ursuline nuns congregated in the Ursuline Convent's chapel, which contained a statue of Our Lady of Prompt Succor, on the night of January 7. There, the group spent the night praying before the statue for the Virgin Mary's intercession on the side of the American forces. On the next morning, Reverend William Dubourg offered Mass at the Convent's altar, and Mother Marie Olivier de Vezin, the prioress of the convent, vowed to have a Mass of Thanksgiving sung annually should the American forces emerge victorious. A courier ran into the chapel during communion to inform them that the British had been defeated. Jackson visited to the convent himself to thank the nuns for their prayers. "By the blessing of heaven, directing the valor of the troops under my command, one of the most brilliant victories in the annals of war was obtained." In 1915, it was written that the vow made by de Vezin had been adhered to by the Convent's nuns.

"Beauty and Booty" controversy
After the battle, a claim was published by George Poindexter, in a letter dated January 20 to the Mississippi Republican, that Pakenham's troops had used "Beauty and Booty" as a watchword. 

The watch-word and countersign of the enemy on the morning of the 8th was,
BOOTY AND BEAUTY
Comment is unnecessary on these significant allusions held out to a licentious soldiery. Had victory declared on their side, the scenes of Havre de Grace, of Hampton, of Alexandria . . . would, without doubt, have been reacted at New Orleans, with all the unfeeling and brutal inhumanity of the savage foe with whom we are contending.

This was republished in Niles' Register, the National Intelligencer on February 13, and other newspapers. Whilst there were criticisms from the Federalist press, as well as from Poindexter's enemies, as to how reliable this information was, it was widely accepted elsewhere. Senator Charles Jared Ingersoll made direct reference to this in his speech to Congress on February 16, reproduced in full in the National Intelligencer. He continued, in an elated manner, 'with the tidings of this triumph from the south, to have peace from the east, is such a fullness of gratification as must overflow all hearts with gratitude.' He saw the news of victory at New Orleans against an immoral foe, followed by news of peace, as a positive sentiment to unite the different peoples of the United States, the zeitgeist of these postwar years later becoming known as the Era of Good Feelings.

This watchword claim, as originated by Poindexter, was repeated in Eaton's "Life of General Jackson", first published in 1817. A second edition of this biography was published in 1824, when Jackson made his first presidential bid. Further editions were published for the presidential elections of 1828 and 1833. Editions from 1824 onwards now contained the claim that documentary evidence proved the watchword was used. As a consequence it was reproduced in a travelogue in 1833.

Following the publishing of a travelogue in 1833, whereby the author James Stuart referred to the watchword, this hitherto unknown controversy became known in Great Britain. In response to the author, five British officers who had fought in the battle, Keane, Lambert, Thornton, Blakeney and Dickson, signed a rebuttal in August 1833. It is stated this was published in The Times by American sources, but this is not the case.
 Somewhat ironically, Niles's Register, which originally printed Poindexter's claim, now printed the British rebuttal.  

 “We, the undersigned, serving in that army, and actually present, and through whom all orders to the troops were promulgated, do, in justice to the memory of that distinguished officer who commanded and led the attack, the whole tenor of whose life was marked by manliness of purpose and integrity of view, most unequivocally deny that any such promise (of plunder) was ever held out to the army, or that the watchword asserted to have been given out was ever issued. And, further, that such motives could never have actuated the man who, in the discharge of his duty to his king and country, so eminently upheld the character of a true British soldier.”

James Stuart's account was criticised by a veteran, Major Pringle, who wrote several letters to the Edinburgh Evening Courant. In response, Stuart published a book to refute these criticisms. He quoted Major Eaton as a reliable source, and later went on to comment that as a result of Stuart, it had become accepted the watchword was a falsehood. One quote from the book 'certainly the refutation of
the charge as stated in Major Eaton’s Book is, though tardy, complete' considered the matter closed. Notwithstanding the refutation, the story had benefited both Jackson and Eaton's political careers, who had nothing left to prove.

The publication of Eaton's book in Britain in 1834, and in subsequent editions, still contained the story of "booty and beauty". The British Ambassador, Sir Charles Richard Vaughan wrote to President Jackson about the matter. Vaughan wrote that Eaton 'expressed himself glad, that the report was at last contradicted' by the rebuttal, but there was no pressure on him to retract his comments from the Jackson biography. There is no recounting in 1833 of Jackson's supposed encounter with the mystery Creole planter (Denis de la Ronde), as reported by S C Arthur (see below).

Arthur's 1915 publication, quoting from Parton's 1861 biography of Jackson, itself quoting extensively from Vincent Nolte's book published in 1854, has referred to a Creole planter reportedly visited a British military camp a few days prior to the battle, being welcomed in after claiming that he was supportive of a possible British takeover of the region. While dining at dinner with a group of British officers, the planter claimed he heard one officer offer the toast of "Beauty and Booty". After gathering information on Pakenham's battle plans, the planter left the camp the next day and reported the information he had gathered to Jackson; the rumor that the British were offering toasts to "Beauty and Booty" soon spread throughout New Orleans, in particular among the upper-class women of the city. Nolte's book reveals the 'planter' to be no other than Denis de la Ronde, the colonel commanding the Third Regiment of the Louisiana Militia. 

In the years since the Treaty of Ghent, not only did Jackson's reputation benefit from his major victory against the British, but also from vilifying the British as an amoral foe, against whom a second war of independence had been fought. As a national hero, it facilitated his subsequent career in politics, and tenure as President of the United States.

Distinguished service as mentioned in dispatches

Memorials

The Louisiana Historical Association dedicated its Memorial Hall facility to Jackson on January 8, 1891, the 76th anniversary of the Battle of New Orleans. The Federal government established a national historical park in 1907 to preserve the Chalmette Battlefield, which also includes the Chalmette National Cemetery. It features the 100-foot-tall Chalmette Monument and is part of the Jean Lafitte National Historical Park and Preserve. The monument was supposed to be at least 150 feet tall but the very soft and wet soil limited it to 100 feet. A five-cent stamp in 1965 commemorated the sesquicentennial of the Battle of New Orleans and 150 years of peace with Britain. The bicentennial was celebrated in 2015 with a Forever stamp depicting United States troops firing on British soldiers along Line Jackson.

Prior to the twentieth century the British government commonly commissioned and paid for statues of fallen generals and admirals during battles to be placed inside St Paul's Cathedral in London as a memorial to their sacrifices. Major Generals Pakenham and Gibbs were both memorialized in a statue at St Paul's that was sculpted by Sir Richard Westmacott.

In popular culture

 The Buccaneer was a 1938 American adventure film produced and directed by Cecil B. De Mille based on Jean Lafitte and the Battle of New Orleans. It was remade in 1958.
 Jimmy Driftwood wrote the song "The Battle of New Orleans" using the melody from "The Eighth of January". It was a 1959 hit for both Johnny Horton (U.S. Number 1) and Lonnie Donegan (U.K. Number 2). The Horton version won the 1960 Grammy Award for Best Country & Western Recording.
 The 1966 US science fiction series The Time Tunnel (series 1, episode 5) portrays the two protagonist time travelers as 'arriving' between the enemy lines the day before the battle and being arrested as 'American spies'.
 Samuel Woodworth wrote the song "The Hunters of Kentucky", first performed in 1822, which was later covered by Burl Ives. The song valorizes the Kentucky militia that fought in the battle, but as historians such as Robert V. Remini have shown, their role was wildly overstated. It became the central campaign song for Andrew Jackson's 1828 presidential election campaign.

See also
 List of War of 1812 battles
 Saint Malo, Louisiana

Notes and citations
Notes

Citations

References

 
 
 
 
 
 
 
 
 
 Drez, Ronald J. (2014). The War of 1812, conflict and deception: the British attempt to seize New Orleans and nullify the Louisiana Purchase. Baton Rouge: Louisiana State University Press, 362 pages, .

 
 
 
 Fraser, Edward, & L. G. Carr-Laughton (1930). The Royal Marine Artillery 1804–1923, Volume 1 [1804–1859]. London: The Royal United Services Institution. 
 
 
 
 Groom, Winston. Patriotic Fire: Andrew Jackson and Jean Laffite at the Battle of New Orleans. New York: Vintage Books, 2006. 
 

 
 
 
 
 

 
 
 

 
 
 
 
 
 
 
 
 
 
 
 
 {{Cite book |last=Stoltz |first=Joseph F. |year=2017 |title=A Bloodless Victory: The Battle of New Orleans in History and Memory]. Baltimore |publisher=Johns Hopkins University Press, 2017.|isbn=978-1-42-142302-9}}
 
 
 

Further reading

Books
 
 
 
 
 Hickey, Donald R. Glorious Victory: Andrew Jackson and the Battle of New Orleans'' (Johns Hopkins University Press, 2015). xii, 154 pp.
 
 
 .

Online
 
 
 
 
 
 
 
 
 
 
 
 

 
1815 in Louisiana
Andrew Jackson
Battles involving the United Kingdom
Battles involving the United States
Conflicts in 1815
19th century in New Orleans
January 1815 events
New Orleans
Naval battles involving pirates
St. Bernard Parish, Louisiana
New Orleans